Miss Russia 2006, was held on December 15, 2006, at Gostiny Dvor Arcade. 60 women competed at the pageant where Tatiana Kotova won representing the Rostov Oblast. Zuleyka Rivera and Taťána Kuchařová participated in the event. The winner represented Russia at the Miss Universe 2007 and Miss World 2007.

Placement

Contestants

External links
 Miss Russia Official Website

Miss Russia
2006 beauty pageants
2006 in Russia